Abdul Kadir Shaikh (1926–2008) was a Judge of the Supreme Court of Pakistan and the 13th governor of Sindh from 6 July 1977 to 17 September 1978. He was born in 1926 and died on 27 March 2008.

Early life 
Shaikh was born in 1926 in Pano Akil.

Mr Justice Abdul Kadir Shaikh was a Judge of Supreme Court of Pakistan. He was also chairman, Authority for the Preservation of Moenjodaro.

He was born in Sukkur (Pakistan) and after obtaining B.A. and L.L.B. Degrees from the University of Bombay, he started legal practice as an Advocate of High Court of Sind from 1948 to 1957 when he was appointed as Assistant Advocate-General, West Pakistan. He was promoted as Additional Advocate-General, West Pakistan, in 1963 and continued in this position until he was elevated as a Judge of High Court of West Pakistan in 1965.

He participated in various Seminars on Law and International Affairs and was also deputed to the United States of America in 1960 for one-year study in Political Science and worked at the House of Representative and the Senate of USA in Washington D.C.

From 1965 to 1974 as a Judge of High Court of West Pakistan he was assigned important additional duties, such as, Tribunal for Legal Profession, Judicial Member of Pakistan Bar Association etc.

In October 1974, he was elevated as a Judge of Supreme Court of Pakistan but in 1975 he was appointed as the Chief Justice of High Court of Sind and continued in this position until July 1979 when he was again appointed as the Judge of Supreme Court of Pakistan. He travelled abroad widely in his official and private capacity, and attended several conferences on Legal, Cultural and Educational matters. As the chairman, Authority for the Preservation of Moenjodaro since 1978, he attended meetings of UNESCO Executive Committee for Moenjodaro at Paris. He was Chairman of International Consultative Committee for Moenjodaro, and a Member of Committee 'de Honour set up by UNESCO under the Honorary Presidency of H.H.R Prince Mikasa of Japan. As a Member of Pakistan National Commission for UNESCO he was concerned with the implementation of cultural and educational programme of UNESCO in Pakistan. He was a Member of the International Court of Arbitration since April,1976.

He was keenly interested in Educational activities. He was chairman of the Board of Governors of Karachi Grammar School, the oldest and the most prestigious educational
institute of Pakistan, having been established in 1884. The school has been recognized by UNESCO and is engaged in various educational programme for other schools in Pakistan
. -
He was appointed as Acting Governor of Sind from March to May 1975 and from July 1977 to September 1978.

Considering the contributions and meritorious services in Culture and History the President of Pakistan conferred upon him the Award of "Sitara-i-Imtiaz" on Pakistan Independence Day - the 14th August,1989.

Death 
He died on 27 March 2008 following catching Disease Illness.

References

1926 births
2008 deaths
Sindhi people
Politicians from Karachi